The 2005 Golden Spin of Zagreb was the 38th edition of an annual senior-level international figure skating competition held in Zagreb, Croatia. It was held at the Dom Sportova between November 11 and 13, 2005. Figure skaters competed in the disciplines of men's singles, ladies' singles, pair skating, and ice dancing. The Junior-level equivalent was the 2005 Golden Bear of Zagreb.

Results

Men

Ladies

Pairs

Ice dancing

External links
 38th Golden Spin of Zagreb

Golden Spin Of Zagreb, 2005
Golden Spin of Zagreb
2000s in Zagreb
Golden Spin Of Zagreb, 2005